Eduardo Rodrigo Domínguez (born 1 September 1978 in Lanús) is an Argentine football manager and former player who mostly played for Huracán as a central defender. He is the manager of Estudiantes.

Club career
Domínguez began his career with Vélez Sársfield in 1996. He was a member of the Vélez side that captured the 1998 Clausura under Marcelo Bielsa. He remained at Vélez until 2002, when he was loaned out to Olimpo de Bahía Blanca.

At Olimpo, Domínguez had a stellar season.  He then joined Racing Club where he suffered a major injury. The following season, he joined Independiente de Avellaneda and quickly recovered his form.

In 2006, he joined Colombian power Independiente Medellín and was one of the club's most important players. After two seasons in Colombia, Domínguez returned to Argentina to play for Huracán during the 2008 Clausura where he established himself as an important first team player.

On July 8, 2008, the Los Angeles Galaxy (Major League Soccer) announced that Eduardo Domínguez had joined the team. Dominguez was not expected to play for the Galaxy until July 19, 2008 when the Galaxy face the New York Red Bulls.  This was due to his pending work visa and for the transfer window to open up on July 15, 2008.

In January, 2009 it was announced that the Los Angeles Galaxy defender Eduardo Dominguez had returned to his previous team, Club Atlético Huracán, signing a one-and-a-half year deal with 'El Globo' according to multiple media reports out of South America in the past week. On the Argentine club's website, they herald his return, calling Dominguez the first big reinforcement of the current transfer window.

After a few weeks in charge of Nacional, in the Uruguayan Primera División, he was dismissed.

Club statistics

Managerial statistics

Personal life
His wife is the daughter of Carlos Bianchi.

References

External links
 
 
 
 
 
 Un Cacho de Glamour
Eduardo Domínguez – Argentine Primera Statistics at Fútbol XXI 

Living people
1978 births
Sportspeople from Lanús
Argentine footballers
Association football defenders
Club Atlético Vélez Sarsfield footballers
Olimpo footballers
Racing Club de Avellaneda footballers
Club Atlético Independiente footballers
Independiente Medellín footballers
Club Atlético Huracán footballers
LA Galaxy players
All Boys footballers
Argentine Primera División players
Argentine expatriate footballers
Expatriate footballers in Colombia
Categoría Primera A players
Expatriate soccer players in the United States
Major League Soccer players
Club Atlético Huracán managers
Club Atlético Colón managers
Argentine football managers
Club Atlético Independiente managers
Estudiantes de La Plata managers